

Clubs by division

Championnat National D1 
Clubs participating in 2015 season:

Championnat National D2

Clubs participating in 2015 season:

Nord 1
AS Borel
AS Cange
AS Rivartibonitienne ("ASR")
AS Verrettes
AS Villard
JS Rivartibotienne ("JSR")
Panthère Noire (Liancourt)
Triomphe de Liancourt
Vision de Hinche
US Papaye

Nord 2
Accolade GM (Gros-Morne)
AS Dessalines
AS l'Estère
AS Saint-Louis du Nord ("ASSL")
AS Trou du Nord
Éclair AC (Gonaïves)
FC Raymond (Jean-Rabel)
Limbé FC
Port-de-Paix FC
Real du Cap

Sud 1
Akolad FN (Fonds-des-Nègres)
AS Aquin
AS Grand-Goâve ("ASGG")
AS Vieux Bourg d'Aquin ("ASVA")
Éclair PG (Petit-Goâve)
FC Juventus des Cayes
Ouragan FC (Les Cayes)
Rangers de Miragoâne
US Dufort

Sud 2
ACADAFOOT
Amateur CS (Cité Soleil)
Barcelone FC (Carrefour)
Club Sportif Saint-Louis
EXAFOOT
Lascahobas FC
Lionceaux FC (Pernier)
Roulado SM (Sources-Matelas)
US Arcahaie
Ynion CS (Cité Soleil)

Championnat National D3
AS Fort-Liberté
AS Limonade
Bacardi FC
Cathorine Flon FC
Dynamite AC (Saint-Marc)
Jeunesse Capoise
La Relève FC (Jérémie)
Milan FC
US Frères (Pétion-Ville)
Zénith FC (Cap-Haïtien)

Source:

Unknown status
AS Carrefour (Carrefour)
Victory SC (Port-au-Prince) [served 2014 1-yr suspension; refused to register 2015–present]

See also
Haitian Football Federation
 Ligue Haïtienne

References

External links
Haiti - List of Foundation Dates at RSSSF.com
Equipes et clubs de Football at Haiti-Référence 

Haiti
 
Football
Football clubs